Pope Matthew of Alexandria may refer to:

Pope Matthew I of Alexandria, ruled in 1378–1408
Pope Matthew II of Alexandria, ruled in 1453–1466
Pope Matthew III of Alexandria, ruled in 1631–1646
Pope Matthew IV of Alexandria, ruled in 1660–1675